Paul Coker Jr. (March 5, 1929 – July 23, 2022) was an American illustrator. He worked in many media, including Mad, character design for Rankin-Bass TV specials, greeting cards, and advertising.

Career
Coker was born in Lawrence, Kansas, the son of Bernice (Rutherford) and Paul Coker. One of his first professional works was in 1946 when he designed Chesty Lion, the mascot for Lawrence High School. His first appearance in Mad was in 1961; he went on to illustrate over 375 articles for the magazine. Beginning in 1967, Coker was a production designer on more than a dozen Rankin/Bass specials and shorts, including Frosty the Snowman, Santa Claus Is Comin' to Town, The Year Without a Santa Claus, Rudolph's Shiny New Year and The Easter Bunny Is Comin' to Town. In 1968, he illustrated the Mad paperback "MAD for Better or Verse"; written by Frank Jacobs, it was the first of eight all-new paperbacks drawn by Coker. In 2002, the magazine also published a collection of "Horrifying Cliches," the long-running feature that featured Coker art. Coker collaborated with writer Don Edwing on two comic strips: "Lancelot" and "Horace and Buggy."

Works

Rankin/Bass Productions
 The Wacky World of Mother Goose (1967) (uncredited)
 Cricket on the Hearth (1967)
 Frosty the Snowman (1969)
 The Reluctant Dragon & Mr. Toad Show (1970)
 Santa Claus is Comin' to Town (1970)
 Here Comes Peter Cottontail (1971)
 The Enchanted World of Danny Kaye (1972)
 The Red Baron (1972)
 Mad Mad Mad Monsters (1972) (uncredited)
 Festival of Family Classics (1972–73)
 'Twas the Night Before Christmas (1974)
 The Year Without a Santa Claus (1974)
 Rudolph's Shiny New Year (1976)
 The First Easter Rabbit (1976)
 Frosty's Winter Wonderland (1976)
 The Easter Bunny is Comin' to Town (1977)
 Nestor, the Long-Eared Christmas Donkey (1977)
 The Stingiest Man in Town (1978)
 Rudolph and Frosty's Christmas in July (1979)
 Jack Frost (1979)
 Pinocchio's Christmas (1980)
 The Leprechauns' Christmas Gold (1981)
 Santa, Baby! (2001)

References

External links
 Lambiek Comiclopedia article.

Complete list of Coker's work for MAD Magazine
Two examples of Coker's original art
Billy Ireland Cartoon Library & Museum Art Database

American comics artists
1929 births
2022 deaths
American illustrators
Mad (magazine) cartoonists
Artists from Kansas
People from Lawrence, Kansas